The Oregon State Beavers baseball team represents Oregon State University in NCAA Division I college baseball. The team participates in the Pac-12 Conference. They are currently coached by Mitch Canham and assistant coaches Ryan Gipson, Darwin Barney and Rich Dorman. They play home games in Goss Stadium at Coleman Field. The Beavers won  the 2006, 2007 and 2018 College World Series to become the winningest collegiate baseball program in the Super Regionals era. In addition, the program has won 26 conference championships, qualified for 21 NCAA tournaments, and appeared in seven College World Series.

Head Coaches 
Records taken from the 2021 Oregon State baseball media guide.

Facilities 

 
Goss Stadium at Coleman Field is the home of Oregon State Baseball. Except for the pitcher's mound, the entire infield uses artificial turf, and the outfield is also artificial. In 2015, the Jacoby Ellsbury Players' Locker Room (in name of Jacoby Ellsbury who donated $1 million to the project) was completed which finished a string of upgrades to Goss Stadium.

Player Awards

All-Americans 
Oregon State players have been named All-Americans 40 times, as of the end of the 2022 season. The university recognizes All-Americans as selected by the American Baseball Coaches Association, Baseball America magazine, the Collegiate Baseball Newspaper, College Baseball Foundation, D1Baseball.com, the National Collegiate Baseball Writers Association, Perfect Game, and USA Today/Sports Weekly.

Key

National Awards

Conference Awards

Other notable players 

 Scott Anderson – MLB pitcher 1987-1995.
 Brian Barden – MLB infielder 2007-2010 and Olympic Bronze Medalist.
 Lute Barnes – MLB player 1972–1973.
 Darwin Barney – MLB Infielder 2010-2017 and 2012 Gold Glove Award winner.
 Bob Beall – MLB Infielder 1975–1980.
 Matthew Boyd - MLB Pitcher for Detroit Tigers 2015-present.
 Jamie Burke – MLB catcher 2001-2010.
 Mitch Canham - Oregon State Head Coach & 2007 All-American.
 Ed Coleman – MLB Outfielder 1932–1936.
 Michael Conforto – MLB outfielder for New York Mets and MLB All Star. 2015–present.
 Jeff Doyle – MLB Infielder 1983.
 Glenn Elliott – MLB Pitcher 1947–1949.
 Jacoby Ellsbury – MLB Outfielder 2007–2017, MLB All-Star, Silver Slugger Award, Gold Glove Award and 2x World Series Champion. 
 Ken Forsch – MLB pitcher from 1970–1986 and 2x MLB All-Star
 Jace Fry - MLB Pitcher for Chicago White Sox 2017-present.
 Sam Gaviglio - MLB Pitcher 2017-present.
 Cole Gillespie - MLB Outfielder 2010-2016.
 Tyler Graham - MLB Outfielder 2012.
 Cadyn Grenier - 2018 MLB 1st Round Draft Pick Baltimore Orioles.
 Don Johnson – MLB player from 1943–1948 and 2x MLB All-Star.
 Eddie Kunz – MLB Pitcher 2008.
 Steven Kwan - MLB Outfielder 2022-present.
 Trevor Larnach - 2018 MLB 1st Round Draft Pick Minnesota Twins.
 John Leovich – MLB Catcher 1941.
 Steve Lyons – MLB Player from 1985–1993 & current television sportscaster.
 Nick Madrigal - MLB 2nd basemen for Chicago White Sox 2020-present. 
 Howard Maple – MLB Catcher 1932.
 Mark McLemore – MLB Pitcher 2007.
 Andrew Moore - MLB Pitcher 2017-2019.
 Jonah Nickerson – 2006 College World Series Most Outstanding Player.
 Joe Paterson – MLB Pitcher 2011–2014.
 Josh Osich - MLB Pitcher for Cincinnati Reds 2015-present.
 Drew Rasmussen - MLB Pitcher for Milwaukee Brewers 2020-present.
 Jorge Reyes – 2007 College World Series Most Outstanding Player (pitcher)
 Daniel Robertson – MLB Outfielder 2014–2017.
 Stefen Romero – MLB Outfielder 2014–2016. Outfielder for the Tohoku Rakuten Golden Eagles of the Nippon Professional Baseball League.
 Adley Rutschman - 2019 Golden Spikes Award Winner, 2018 College World Series Most Outstanding Player and 2019 MLB 1st overall pick.
 Wes Schulmerich – MLB Outfielder 1931–1934.
 Mike Stutes – MLB Pitcher 2011-2013.
 Andrew Susac – MLB catcher for Pittsburgh Pirates, 2014–present.
 Mike Thurman – MLB Pitcher 1997–2002.
 Chris Wakeland – MLB Outfielder 2001.

See also
 List of NCAA Division I baseball programs

References

External links
 Oregon Stater: Making it look easy
 National Champions Oral History Interviews

 
1907 establishments in Oregon
Baseball teams established in 1907